Spokane is an unincorporated community and census-designated place (CDP) in Concordia Parish, Louisiana, United States. As of the 2010 census it had a population of 442.

It is located in northeastern Concordia Parish on the southwest side of Lake St. John, an oxbow lake that is a former channel of the Mississippi River. Louisiana State Highway 568 leads southwest from Spokane  to Ferriday.

Demographics

References

Census-designated places in Concordia Parish, Louisiana
Census-designated places in Louisiana
Census-designated places in Natchez micropolitan area